New business development concerns all the activities involved in realizing new business opportunities, including product or service design, business model design, and marketing. 
When splitting business development into two parts, we have: ‘business’ and ‘development’. The first things that come into mind when looking at business are: economics, finance, managerial activities, competition, prices, marketing, etc. All of these keywords are related to risk and entrepreneurship and clearly indicate the primary scope of the term ‘business development’.
Development is very abstract and can be linked with some of the following keywords: technological improvement, cost reduction, general welfare, improved relations, movement in a (positive) direction, etc.
 
In the traditional definition of Business development, Business Development is mostly seen as growing an enterprise, with a number of techniques. The mentioned techniques differ, but in fact all of them are about traditional marketing. The main question in these issues is: how to find, reach and approach customers and how to make/keep them satisfied, possibly with new products. Since this definition is limited and lacks some essential factors in business developing, a complete new definition of Business Development will be introduced. Of course, the theory on “traditional” marketing is still correct and can be adopted from the old definition. 
When supplying a solution, it is important to focus on the total offering you give instead of only focusing on the product or service. An offering is a package consisting of different proportions of physical product, service, advice, delivery and the costs, including price that are involved in using it. Hereby the advice, adaptation to the customer and the costs are the most important factors to get the right combination within the offering. 

Drawing on contingency theory, an idea central to new business development is that different product-market- technology combinations can require different marketing strategies and business models to make them a success (Tidd et al., 2005). To chart the factors that are involved and create synergy between them, new business development draws heavily upon the fields of technology and business networks. 
The new business development process is to recognize chances and opportunities in a fast changing technological environment. Often uncertainty arises because of new technology and their new markets.

Technology of business 
Innovative technology provide important opportunities for new business development. For a company it is important to keep products and processes up to date, to stay competitive (Ford et al., 2006). Continuous investment in innovation for both products and processes makes it more difficult for others to offer a large technological functionality advantage (Schilling, 2003). Many companies need technological development to stay competitive. Technological development can occur through making decisions about acquiring, exploiting and managing technologies. These decisions should be made by involving the research and development staff, purchasing staff and marketers. (Ford et al., 2006) The customers are also important (Schilling, 2003; Ford et al., 2006).
  
Furthermore technology can be analyzed by the concept/framework of value configuration as introduced by Norwegian academics Stabell and Fjedstad (1998). The framework consists of three value configurations, which are an extension of the value chain model developed by Michael Porter:
the value chain (transformation of inputs in products),
the value shop (solving customer problems), and
 the value network (linking customers).
These configurations overcome some of the issues with the traditional value chain model, which is only helpful for traditional manufacturing companies. In practice, firms are not pure instances of a single distinct value configuration, multiple combinations of configurations can be found within one firm.

The value creation process can also be understood from the perspective of Schilling. Schilling talks about value in the sense of technological functionality, installed base and complementary goods of a product. (Schilling, 2003). It may be clear that technology plays an important role in this value creation process, and in general contributes to the process of renewing the match between problem and solution.

Business networks 
Traditional marketing is usually based on economic models (Williamson, 1975). In those pure economic models there is no room for negotiations or special treatment for different companies. A technological environment, however, can be very uncertain and therefore competitors have to rely heavily on their business networks. It is then that special treatments and negotiations are necessary.

It is important to recognize the effect social relations have on economic action, including business development (Ford et al., 2006). Granovetter also argues that social relations in a network lead to trust between partners, an important factor for stable development in a dynamic environment. By focusing on these new activities, it becomes difficult to keep every activity up-to-date and to maintain the competitive advantage (Ford et al., 2006). Companies therefore increasingly concentrate their investment and their activities on only a few activities which they believe to be their core business, otherwise their competitive advantage is easily lost. Because they concentrate on just a few activities, they need business relations for the other activities (Ford et al., 2006).

Relationships are usually based on resource ties, activity links and/or actor bonds (Ford et al., 2006). A company should therefore analyze their firm itself, their relationships and their business networks in terms of activities, actors and resources. In this way, a company can determine where there are new opportunities for relationships and where resources, technologies and/or skills can be developed, integrated or exploited from other companies (Ford et al., 2006). In this way, business development can be established with help of this business network.
 
Nowadays, marketing is about the exchange of heterogeneous resources between dynamic, cooperating partners in network-like structures (Hakansson et al., 2004). It is about relationships, not about selling products. So, business marketers should be busy finding, developing and managing of relationships within the complex network that surrounds them (Ford et al., 2006). Blois (2004) provides three ways in which a firm can evolve from market to network mechanism. These are entrepreneurial alertness (being alert to value-creating opportunities), path dependence (historical events cause solutions to problems and become “locked in”) and replaceability (irreplaceable contributors get much attention of others trying to influence them).

It is still questionable to what extent these networks are involved by social relations, since the mentioned authors do not agree on this. Therefore, enterprises have to cope with the problem of how to maintain their network contacts.

References

Further reading
Ford, D., L. E. Gadde, et al. (2006). The Business Marketing Course, Chichester, John Wiley and Sons Ltd.
Hakansson, H., I. Henjesand, et al. (2004). "Introduction: rethinking marketing" in Rethinking Marketing: developing a new understanding of markets, Chichester, John Wiley and Sons Ltd: 1-12.
Kotler, P. and Keller K.L. (2006), Marketing Management, 12th edition, Pearson, Prentice Hall.
Tidd, J., Bessant J., Pavitt K. (2005), Managing innovation: Integrating technological, market and organizational change, 3rd Edition, Haddington: Scotprint.
Schilling, M. A. (2003), "Technological Leapfrogging: Lessons from the U.S. Video Game Console Industry", California Management Review 45(3): 6-32.

Entrepreneurship